Defiant Theatre was a Chicago-based theatre company founded in 1993 by a group of students from the University of Illinois at Urbana-Champaign, which includes Nick Offerman. The eclectic troupe specialized in productions that emphasized inventive stagecraft, perverse and controversial topics, and skillful stage combat. While the company is highly regarded for original plays such as Action Movie: The Play and Godbaby, Defiant Theatre received notable attention for productions of plays by Caryl Churchill, Alfred Jarry, Sarah Kane, and William Shakespeare. Chicago Magazine named Defiant the "Best Experimental Theatre" in their August 1999 Best of Chicago issue. The company disbanded in 2004.

Production history

1993/1994 season

Hamlet
by William Shakespeare
directed by Christopher Johnson
Opened Friday, November 19, 1993 at The Greenview Arts Center
"Rosencrantz and Guildenstern may be dead; Defiant Theatre's Hamlet most certainly is not." - Chicago Reader

Landscape of the Body
by John Guare
directed by Darren Critz  
Opened Friday, February 11, 1994 at American Theater Company
"A smoother, more consistent presentation might not have been able to reach the emotional heights of Defiant Theatre's Landscape of the Body." - Newcity

The Quarantine
by Darren Critz
directed by Joe Foust
CHICAGO PREMIERE
at Strawdog Theatre Company
"Defiant Theatre has come up with some splendidly gruesome, darkly comic stage images... Defiant Theatre is clearly a company to keep an eye on." - Chicago Reader 
"Do you have good taste? Check it at the door." - Gay Chicago Magazine

1994/1995 season

The Dumb Waiter/Victoria Station
by Harold Pinter
The Dumb Waiter directed by Joe Foust
Victoria Station directed by Rob Kimmel
at Angel Island
"Kindles with riveting slowness to a small but triumphant climax." - Chicago Reader

Women and Water
by John Guare
directed by Darren Critz
at American Theater Company
"What is most thrilling about this production is how well it reveals the subtleties of Guare's play." - Chicago Reader

Apt Pupil
based on the novella by Stephen King
adapted and directed by Christopher Johnson
WORLD PREMIERE
Opened Thursday, May 4, 1995 at The Preston Bradley Center
"It's given me vivid nightmares for the past two nights (and counting)." - Chicago Reader

1996 season

The Ugly Man
by Brad Fraser
directed by Linda Gillum & Barb Wruck Thometz
CHICAGO PREMIERE
Opened Saturday, January 13, 1996 at Strawdog Theatre Company
"The Defiant production has just the right tone." - Chicago Tribune
"It just becomes disgustingly irresistible." - Gay Chicago Magazine

Ubu Raw
based upon Alfred Jarry's Ubu Roi
adapted by Joe Foust & Richard Ragsdale
directed by Joe Foust
WORLD PREMIERE
Opened Saturday, June 1, 1996 at American Theater Company
"The most sensational off-Loop show to hit the stage in a very long time... The  production is truly remarkable." - Chicago Tribune 
"Breathtaking disregard for their own safety." - Chicago Reader 
"Simultaneously assaulting and seductive, and violently metaphoric." - Newcity

Red Dragon
based upon the novel by Thomas Harris
adapted and directed by Christopher Johnson
WORLD PREMIERE
Opened Wednesday, October 23, 1996 at The Firehouse
"Defiant Theatre pulls no punches in this production that could have easily tumbled over into camp." - Windy City Times

1997 season

The Mystery of Irma Vep
by Charles Ludlam
directed by Jim Slonina
Opened Monday, May 5, 1997 at National Pastime Theater
"Blisteringly intelligent comedy." - Chicago Sun-Times 
"A nonstop laugh riot." - Newcity 
"She's way fun!" - Nightlines

Caligula
by Albert Camus
directed by Richard Ragsdale
Opened Monday, July 21, 1997 at The Griffin Theatre
"Defiant presents plenty of philosophy with fornication." - Nightlines

The Skriker
by Caryl Churchill
directed by Linda Gillum
CHICAGO PREMIERE
Opened Monday, October 13, 1997 at American Theater Company
"An ensemble work in every aspect... They've put on one hell of a show." - Chicago Tribune 
"Defiant Theatre has essentially created a dark puppet extravaganza." - Chicago Sun-Times 
"***1⁄2 The eerie tale is wrapped in a keen and often inspired visual design." - Gay Chicago Magazine

1998 season

Phaedra's Love
by Sarah Kane
directed by Lisa Rothschiller
AMERICAN PREMIERE
Opened Wednesday, June 10, 1998 at American Theater Company
"It's punk, pulp fiction classicism, whipped into a frenzy in a tight, stylish production." - Chicago Reader 
"**** We're appalled by this heinous clan — but, boy, I loved going to their party." - Gay Chicago Magazine

Action Movie: The Play
by Joe Foust & Richard Ragsdale
directed by Joe Foust
WORLD PREMIERE
Opened Wednesday, July 22, 1998 at American Theater Company
"Unforgettable theatrical thrills." - Chicago Tribune 
"Action Movie charms its audience with sly nods to its predictability." - Chicago Sun-Times 
"A visceral, confrontational theatergoing experience... The company has managed to put all the blockbuster films this summer to shame." - Chicago Reader

Dracula
by Mac Wellman
directed by Richard Ragsdale
CHICAGO PREMIERE
Opened Monday, October 5, 1998 at Charybdis Multi-Arts Complex
"Defiant gives the script's malevolent camp a pointed recklessness." - Chicago Reader 
"A healthy dose of both heaving bosoms and good-old fashioned shtick." - Newcity

1999 season

Bluebeard
by Charles Ludlam
directed by Jim Slonina
Opened Thursday, March 11, 1999 at Victory Gardens Theater Downstairs Studio
"Gleefully indulges Ludlam's cheese-ball side... Gloriously awful." - Chicago Reader 
"A shared culture of B-movie proportions while being lovingly, and skillfully, over-the-top theatrical." - Newcity 
"A colorful diversion. Or is that perversion?... Full of wit and energy, it's well worth checking out." - Windy City Times

Action Movie: The Play: The Director's Cut
by Joe Foust & Richard Ragsdale
directed by Joe Foust
Opened Wednesday, June 16, 1999 at American Theater Company
"A veritable feast of outstanding stage combat, fantastic puppets, inventive directorial ideas... It's more fun than most any summer film." - Chicago Tribune 
"The play's endless stunts are just as brilliantly executed and breathtaking as they were before." - Chicago Reader 
"Defiant has set themselves up for a nice franchise." - Newcity

Burning Desires
by Joan Schenkar
directed by Linda Gillum
MIDWEST PREMIERE
Opened Wednesday, November 3, 1999 at National Pastime Theater
"A very interesting play with serious intellectual heft... There's no doubting this troupe's stellar theatrical chops." - Chicago Tribune 
"The Defiant folks prove once again why they are among the most creative companies currently working in Chicago." - Windy City Times

2000 season

The Love Talker
by Deborah Pryor
directed by Richard Ragsdale
at Victory Gardens Theater Downstairs Studio
"Rich with storytelling make-believe." - Citysearch

Godbaby
by Christopher Johnson
directed by Jim Slonina
WORLD PREMIERE
Opened Friday, June 16, 2000 at American Theater Company
"A manic production by one local company that lives up to its name--Defiant Theatre." - Chicago Sun-Times
<blockquote>
"Godbaby'''s scholarship alone would be an accomplishment worthy of commendation. That the Defiant company makes it so much fun is an additional blessing." - Windy City Times
</blockquote>

Macbeth
by William Shakespeare
directed by Christopher Johnson
Opened Friday, October 27, 2000 at The Viaduct
"The whole production has the rough, raw air of a medieval mystery play, charged with violence and spiritualism." - Chicago Tribune
"If Shakespeare were this exciting in school, he'd be bigger than Harry Potter." - Chicago Free Press
"If there's one word to describe Defiant Theatre's Macbeth, it's "Wow!" - Lerner Booster

2001 season

Cleansed
by Sarah Kane
directed by Lisa Rothschiller
AMERICAN PREMIERE
Opened Friday, March 16, 2001 at The Viaduct
"A contemporary night of the living dead." - Chicago Sun-Times
"Everyone in this production, from the light designer to each of the actors, takes big risks. But the risks pay off in poetry." - Newcity

Fortinbras
by Lee Blessing
directed by Justin Fletcher
Opened Friday, September 14, 2001 at The Viaduct
"Defiant's well-crafted production is exceptionally well-acted." - Chicago Tribune

Sci-fi Action Movie in Space Prison
written and directed by Joe Foust
WORLD PREMIERE
Opened Saturday, December 8, 2001 at American Theater Company
"Its comic-strip overkill is amusing and invigorating." - Chicago Tribune
"The Defiant ones have clearly worked their asses off to produce a mind-blowing show." - Chicago Free Press

2002 season

Flaming Guns of the Purple Sage
by Jane Martin
directed by Linda Gillum
CHICAGO PREMIERE
Opened Friday, March 29, 2002 at The Viaduct
"Defiant does gothic redneck pulp far better than most... It's great tacky fun." - Chicago Tribune
"**** Defiant hits the bulls-eye." - Gay Chicago Magazine
"An evening of good, clean, slam-bang messy fun." - Windy City Times

Dope
by Christopher Johnson
directed by Christopher Johnson & Jim Slonina
WORLD PREMIERE
Opened Friday, July 5, 2002 at American Theater Company
"A wild ride on a crazily off-kilter roller coaster." - Chicago Sun-Times

Nicholas DeBeaubien's The Hunchback of Notre Dame
by John Kohler, Larry Larson, Levi Lee and Rebecca Wackler
directed by Jim Slonina
MIDWEST PREMIERE
Opened Thursday, September 12, 2002 at A Red Orchid Theatre
"The well-versed actors fully commit to the material." - Gay Chicago Magazine

2003 season

Titus Andronicus
by William Shakespeare
directed by Christopher Johnson
Opened Friday, January 17, 2003 at The Viaduct
"A mixed-up contemporary shebang, full of unruly life... Some of the violence is just plain fabulous." - Chicago Tribune

Defiant Fabulon
featuring Fabulon Historifarciconby Christopher Johnson
directed by Jim Slonina
Opened Friday, August 8, 2003 at The Viaduct
"It was a gas... Defiant has built its reputation on excess and outrage." - Chicago Tribune

Dracula
by Steven Dietz
adapted from the novel by Bram Stoker
directed by Richard Ragsdale
Opened Sunday, October 12, 2003 at The Vittum Theatre
"Defiant Theatre, not a troupe to shy away from the eek, the ook or even the odd "uck," has a spirited blood-sucker now on display, just in time for Halloween." - Chicago Tribune

2004 season

Action Movie: The Play
by Joe Foust & Richard Ragsdale
directed by Joe Foust
Opened Sunday, April 18, 2004 at The Chopin Theatre
"Its replication of and commentary on the clichés of its testosterone-fueled genre is as timely as the product it mocks." - Windy City Times

The Pyrates
based on the novel by George MacDonald Fraser
adapted by Justin Fletcher & Richard Ragsdale
directed by Justin Fletcher
Opened Sunday, June 27, 2004 at The Chopin Theatre
"A textbook example of Chicago pop-fusion theater." - Chicago Sun-Times

A Clockwork Orange
by Anthony Burgess
adapted from his novel
directed by Christopher Johnson
Opened Thursday, September 9, 2004 at Gallery 37's Storefront Theater
"There's more than enough here to remind us of why we'll miss this historically important theater company." - Chicago Tribune

Awards

1996Ubu RawAfter Dark Award
 Overall Technical Achievement

1997Red DragonJoseph Jefferson Citations
 Original Adaptation - Christopher Johnson
 Actor in a Principal Role - Christopher Thometz
 Sound Design - Brian & Matthew Callahan
 Original Music - Sean Sinitski

1998The SkrikerJoseph Jefferson Citations
 Costume Design - Carol Cox, Jennifer Keller, Sarah Laleman, Beth Nowak, Christine Pascual
 Puppetry and Masks - B. Emil Boulos, Joe Foust, Andrew Leman, Nick Offerman, Sean Sinitski, Christopher Thometz
After Dark Award
 Overall Technical AchievementAction Movie: The PlayAfter Dark Awards
 Sound Design - Gregor Mortis, Greg Nishimura, Prank, Sean Sinitski
 Direction - Joe Foust

2001CleansedAfter Dark Awards
 Direction - Lisa Rothschiller
 Outstanding Ensemble

2002FortinbrasJoseph Jefferson Citation
 Actor in a Supporting Role - Jim SloninaFlaming Guns of the Purple SageAfter Dark Award
 Outstanding Production

2005Action Movie: The Play''
Joseph Jefferson Citations
 Outstanding Ensemble
 Sound Design - Gregor Mortis
 Fight Choreography - Joe Foust & Geoff Coates

References

 PerformInk profile article about Defiant Theatre
 PerformInk article about Defiant's closing
 Chicago Tribune review/article of A Clockwork Orange and Defiant's closing

Theatre companies in Chicago
Performing groups established in 1993
Performing groups disestablished in 2004